Cheddar most often refers to either:
Cheddar cheese
Cheddar, Somerset, the village after which Cheddar cheese is named

Cheddar may also refer to:

Places
 Cheddar, Ontario, Canada
 Cheddar Yeo, a river which flows through Cheddar Gorge and the village of Cheddar

Food and service
 Cheddaring, a process in the manufacturing of cheddar cheese
 Cheddars, a brand of biscuit

Other uses
Cheddar (TV channel), a live and on demand financial news network
"Cheddar" (Brooklyn Nine-Nine), a television episode
 Slang for money

See also
 Cheddar Valley (disambiguation)
 Cheddar Complex, a biological site of special scientific interest
 Cheddar Gorge, the largest gorge in the UK
 Cheddar Man, the Mesolithic remains of a human male found in Cheddar Gorge
 Cheddar Reservoir, an artificial water reservoir
 Cheddar's Scratch Kitchen, a Florida-based chain of dining restaurants
 Cheddar Wood, a site of special scientific interest